Trina Medina is a Venezuelan Salsa and Son singer, songwriter and music arranger. She wrote the music for the 2007 Venezuelan film Una abuela virgen, the music for the 1999 film At Midnight and a Half and the soundtrack for the film I Like It Like That includes Trina's rendition of Anda Y Camina.  She has also played "Felicidad" on the 2004 RCTV drama "Negra consentida". For the last four years she has been Deputy Headteacher of Culture at the Central University of Venezuela (UCV).

Her mother Canelita Medina is also a Venezuelan singer and passed on her talent to Trina. Her father, Alfredo Sojo, was a pianist and died in 1992.

Biography

Her powerful voice placed her at the front of the Venezuelan music scene after acting as a backup singer on music pieces that marked history: alongside  Frank Quintero, recording “Mí no tiene con qué”, and alongside Venezuelan Caribbean pop singer/songwriter Yordano with whom she started touring in 1989, recording “Robando Azules”, “Por estas calles y "Madera Fina". In an impromptu musical show with Luis Enrique yand Tony Vega, held in Puerto Rico, the President of Sony BMG Latin America, Ángel Carrasco, proposed a recording contract, and she then became a solo artist in 1995.

Her debut album has sold over 20,000 to date. It was recorded entirely in Puerto Rico, and gained her the respect, not only of the music industry, but also of the public and musics critics. Due to the success of this record, as well as of the single "Entrega" recorded beforehand under the same label, a global sparkling drinks company hired her to be the voice of their Puerto Rican marketing campaign. On accepting this post she decided to release the album in Miami and New York City for the Latin populations. At this time, Trina shared the stage with large orchestras and well-known personalities in New York City, amongst whom were La Orquesta de la luz, El Gran Combo, Ismael Miranda, Cheo Feliciano and Willie Colón.

She spent nine years studying classical harmony, singing, composing, arranging, piano accompaniment. She plays electric bass and percussion (maracas, güiro, chekeres).

References

External links 
 Trina Medina official website (Spanish)
 Profile in french, including photos
 Salsatalks article

1960 births
Living people
20th-century Venezuelan women singers
21st-century Venezuelan women singers